Susan Hutton (born December 1968 New York City) is an American poet.

Life
She was raised in and around Detroit, Michigan.

She graduated from Kalamazoo College, and from the University of Michigan with an MFA, where she studied with Linda Gregerson, David Baker, and Larry Goldstein.  She held a Wallace Stegner fellowship in poetry at Stanford University. 
She lived in Pittsburgh, Pennsylvania, and was director of development for Autumn House Press.

Her work has appeared in Crazyhorse, DoubleTake, Poetry, FIELD, Mid-American Review, Ploughshares, Prairie Schooner.

She lives in Ann Arbor, Michigan, with her husband and two children.

Awards
 2008 John C. Zacharis First Book Award

Works
"Atmospherics", Poetry, October 2006 
"Seven Journeys"; "My List"; "On the Vanishing of Large Creatures", Michigan Today, September 2006
"Seven Journeys", AGNI, 2004
"On the Vanishing of Large Creatures", Ploughshares, Spring 2004

Reviews
Susan Hutton has put together a first book that feels completely finished—each poem has been smoothed over like a pebble in a stream. As a whole, it is airtight.

References

External links
"Author's website"
"Microreviews", Boston Review, MARCH/APRIL 2008

1968 births
Kalamazoo College alumni
University of Michigan alumni
Living people
American women poets
21st-century American poets
21st-century American women writers